Zoroastrianism in India has significant history within the country. Zoroastrians have lived in the Indian subcontinent since the Sasanian period. The Zoroastrians also moved to India in successive migrations during the Islamic period. The initial migration following the Muslim conquest of Persia has been canonized as a religious persecution by invading Muslims. Zoroastrianism meanwhile suffered a decline in Iran after the conquests. Subsequent migrations also took place after the attempts by Safavids to convert their subjects to Shiism.

 Due to persecution of Zoroastrians in other countries and the liberal atmosphere and patronisation of India, today the largest population of Zoroastrians resides in India, where Zoroastrians have been allowed to play a notable role in the Indian economy, entertainment, the armed forces, and the Indian freedom movement during British Raj. The Zoroastrian groups are regarded as either Parsi or Irani depending on the time of migration to India.

History 
By 632 CE, Yazdgird III came to power in Persia but the Arab/Muslim army had already begun invading Persia. The Muslims defeated them at Nahavand and Yazdgird was slain by a miller in Merv in 652, bringing an end to the Sasanian dynasty and with it Zoroastrianism's history as the official religion of Iran. While losing their religion and script along with some Sasanian historiographical literature, the language and culture essentially survived. Between the seventh and thirteenth century, political and social pressures resulted in ascendancy of Iranian Muslim over the Zoroastrians. With the conquests, Iranians gradually lost their predominant religion.

The Zoroastrians moved to India in successive migrations in the Islamic period. The initial migration following the conquest has been characterized as a religious persecution by invading Muslims. According to the account, the Zoroastrians suffered at their hands and in order to protect themselves and safeguard their religion, fled first to northern Iran, then to the island of Hormuz and finally to India. This generally accepted narrative of migration emphasises Muslim persecution while identifying Parsis as religious refugees. Recently, scholars have questioned this explanation of Iranian origins. There is a scarcity of sources about the migration. Historians are forced to rely exclusively on Qissa-i Sanjan written in 1599 by a Parsi Priest and Qissah-ye Zartushtian-e Hindustan written more than 200 years later. This is complicated by the fact that there were already Zoroastrians in India in the Sasanian period.

Iranian Zoroastrians are known to have been trading with India for centuries before the dates calculated for arrival of Parsis per Qissa-i Sanjan. Ruksana Nanji and Homi Dhalla while discussing archaeological evidence for 'The Landing of Zoroastrians at Sanjan', conclude that the most likely date for the migration at the start of the middle phase of their chronology, namely the early-to-mid-eighth century. Nevertheless, they express their general skepticism about the Qissa-i Sanjan account.  Scholar Andre Wink has theorized that Zoroastrian immigrants to India, both before and after the Muslim conquest of Iran, were primarily merchants, since evidence suggests it was only some time after their arrival that religious experts and priests were sent for to join them. He argues that the competition over trade routes with Muslims may also have contributed to their immigration.

Although historically unsubstantiated, the story of how Zoroastrians gained permission to step on the shores of Gujarat continues to be critical to the self-identity of the group. Per the commonly told narrative, the Rajah of Sanjan, summoned them and demanded to know how they wouldn't be a burden on or a threat to the indigenous communities. Replying to their request of practising their religion and till the land, he showed them a jug full of milk, saying Sanjan like it was full. In one version, a dastur added a coin to the milk, saying like the coin, no one would be able to see that they were there but they would enrich the milk nonetheless. In another version, he added sugar instead and claimed that like it, they would sweeten lands of Sanjan. In both of them their settlement is approved by the Rajah who addresses certain conditions for it: they would explain their religion, promise not to proselytise, adopt Gujarati speech and dress, surrender their weapons and only conduct their rituals after nightfall. During this period, Zoroastrian traders faced execution outside India, including in China where many were killed during the Guangzhou massacre.

The immigration of Zoroastrians to India continued, and by 1477 they had lost all contact with Persia. Not until three hundred years had passed would they come into contact. Zoroastrians also played a notable role during the freedom movements of India. There were also subsequent migrations, especially resulting from attempts of Safavids' to convert their subjects to Shia Islam in the sixteenth century. This added to the Parsi population and cemented their close association with Iran.

Demographics 

According to the 2011 Census of India, there are 57,264 Parsis in India, and the 2014 figures indicate there are now 69,000. The previous figure  of Zoroastrians in the diaspora, and on the results of the Indian census of 1981, which counted over 71,630 Zoroastrians. Independent estimates are that there are at least 100,000 Zoroastrians in India. Parsis mother tongue is Gujarati.

The Zoroastrian community in India remains one of the most recognized groups, playing a part in various commercial sectors such as industry, movies, and politics.

Communities 
There are two major Zoroastrian communities in India.

Parsi 

The word Parsi in the Persian language literally means "Persian". Persian is the official language of modern Iran, which is also known as Persia. The language (Parsi) is commonly referred to as Farsi, because, after the Arab invasion of Persia, because of the absence of the "P / G / Zh / Ch" sounds in the Arabic language, Parsi became Farsi. Similarly, Babak Khorramdin's first name, originally Papak (Papa + Kuchak = Papak), "Young Father", became Babak.

The long presence of the Parsis in the Gujarat and Sindh areas of India is supported by a genetic study and it also distinguishes them from the smaller Zoroastrian Indian community of Iranis, who are more recent arrivals.

Iranis 

Although the term 'Irani' is first attested during the Mughal era, most Iranis are immigrants who arrived on the subcontinent during the 19th and early 20th centuries, that is, when Iran was ruled by the Qajars and when religious persecution of non-Muslims was rampant. The descendants of the immigrants of those times remain culturally and linguistically closer to the Zoroastrians of Iran, in particular to the Zoroastrians of Yazd and Kerman. Consequently, the Dari dialect of the Zoroastrians of those provinces may be heard among the Iranis.

See also 
 List of countries by Zoroastrian population
 Indo-Sasanians
 List of fire temples in India

External links 
Zoroastrianism and Hinduism - a comparison of both religions and exploring the origins of Zoroastrianism

References 

 
India